Steinnes is a rock point on the southeast shore of Prydz Bay, about 4 nautical miles (7 km) east-northeast of Larsemann Hills. First mapped from air photographs by the Lars Christensen Expedition (1936) and named Steinnes (stone point).

Headlands of Princess Elizabeth Land
Ingrid Christensen Coast